C. Umamaheswara Rao is an Indian film director, screenwriter, aesthetician and producer known for his works predominantly in Telugu cinema. He has also scripted and directed a few television serials for Doordarshan. He has garnered two Nandi Awards, and the 
National Film Award. He is also Social and Cultural activist. He is born in Vijayawada now the new capital of Andhrapradesh.

From his childhood his voracious reading of books had driven him towards literature and performing arts and to progressive ideologies. In his early years, he had written poetry and short stories in Telugu.

His Telugu legendary film Ankuram, first film of its kind on human rights and civil liberties bagged him National Award and AP State's Best Director Award and many Civilian. His Sreekaram, a Telugu film on hazardous trail on in-camera court against woman rape victim by defence lawyers, gained him AP state's Feature film Award. Actually, this film dealt with Kiranjit Ahluwalia's case prior to Aishwarya Ray's film ‘Provoked’. To mention some more are much accoladed ‘Stree’, a documentary on the exploitation faced by Indian woman, very popular TV serials like ‘Himabindu’, ‘Mr. Brahmanandam ‘and Telefilms like Hamsafar (Hindi), Manchu Bomma and many more. He had many short and ad films to his credit.

Recently he had done 15 Telefilms on Film aesthetics for Ur films. They have been successfully telecast in 10 TV. And they are being shown in so many short film festivals for educating the participants.

He is the Chairman of Jury in 4 Short Film festivals and had been the jury member in AP State Awards Committee 2010 and twice Juror in UNESCO Ladli Awards Committee.

He acted as the Chairman of the West panel of National Film Awards 2019 and had been in the Central Committee.

He was in the Jury for Oscars in Indian Entry Selections 2020.

He has formed Center for New Perspectives in Film and Media, Hyderabad.

He is the Chairman for Dadasaheb Phalke School of Film and Media, which has an Advisory Board chaired by Mr. Allu Aravind and members being M/s Vijayendra Prasad, Resool Pookutty, Madhu Ambat, Neelakanta, Sreekar Prasad, Indraganti Mohan Krishna, Paruchuri Bros., etc. as advisors.

Awards
National Film Awards 
 Best Feature Film in Telugu (director) - Ankuram (1992)

Nandi Awards
 Best Director - Ankuram (1992)
 Best Feature Film - Sreekaram (1996)
Revathi won her First Film Fare Award in Telugu

K.V.Reddy Award - Best Director - Ankuram (1992)

Filmography

Director

Documentary
Many documentaries to his credit, one of which is
 Sthree (APFDC Award for Best Documentary)

Telefilm
 Hamsafar (Hindi )
 Manchu Bomma (2011) (TELUGU) :  For ETV much accoladed telefilm.
Educational films
 15 EPISODES ON FILM AESTHETICS (2015) : Have done for Ur film School & Telecast in 10 TV

References

External links
 

Telugu film directors
Telugu film producers
Film producers from Andhra Pradesh
Filmfare Awards South winners
Nandi Award winners
Living people
Film directors from Andhra Pradesh
20th-century Indian film directors
21st-century Indian film directors
Telugu screenwriters
Writers from Vijayawada
20th-century Indian dramatists and playwrights
21st-century Indian dramatists and playwrights
Businesspeople from Vijayawada
Screenwriters from Andhra Pradesh
Year of birth missing (living people)